This is a list of museums in Botswana.

List 
 Botswana National Museum
 Kgosi Bathoen II (Segopotso) Museum
 Kgosi Sechele I Museum
 Khama III Memorial Museum
 Nhabe Museum
 Phuthadikobo Museum
 Supa Ngwao Museum
 Nhabe Museum
 Khama III Museum in Serowe

See also 
 List of museums

External links 
 Museums in Botswana

 
Botswana
Museums
Museums
Museums
Botswana